Ursus or Orso (died 892) succeeded his father, Aiulf II, as Prince of Benevento in 890 or 891. Ursus did not long hold this post. He was deposed after the capture of Benevento by the Byzantine strategos of Calabria, Sybbaticius. Benevento became, albeit briefly, the capital of the thema of Langobardia. His epitaphium says:

References

Princes of Benevento
9th-century rulers in Europe
9th-century Lombard people